Okan may refer to:

 Okan (Go competition), a Japanese Go competition
 Okan University, private university in Istanbul, Turkey
 Okanagan Valley Railway (reporting mark: OKAN)
 Okan (band), Canadian world music group

Given name 
 Okan Alkan, Turkish footballer
 Okan Aydın, Turkish-German footballer
 Okan Buruk, Turkish football manager
 Okan Bayülgen, Turkish actor
 Okan Deniz (born 1994), Turkish footballer
 Okan Derici, Turkish footballer
 Okan Ersoy, American scientist
 Okan Koç, Turkish footballer
 Okan Özçelik, Turkish footballer
 Okan Öztürk, Turkish footballer
 Okan Patirer, Turkish actor
 Okan Yılmaz, Turkish footballer

Middle name 
 Tekin Okan Düzgün (born 1988), Turkish paralympic goalball player

Surname 
 Tanju Okan (1938–1996), Turkish singer

See also 
Okun (disambiguation)

Turkish masculine given names